Sergeant John Pointon Beech (May 1, 1844 – November 27, 1926) was an English soldier who fought in the American Civil War. Beech was awarded the United States' highest award for bravery during combat, the Medal of Honor, for his action during the Battle of Spotsylvania Court House in Virginia on May 12, 1864. He was honored with the award on June 5, 1894.

Biography
Beech was born in Stratfordshire, England and joined the 4th New Jersey Infantry at Trenton, New Jersey in August 1861. On May 12, 1864, during the Battle of Spotsylvania Court House, most of the members of an artillery battery, deployed in front of Beech's company, were killed by enemy fire. Beech voluntarily assisted the remaining artillery men, despite being under heavy fire. It is for this act of bravery that he was awarded the Medal of Honor in 1894.

Beech died in New Jersey on November 27, 1926 and his remains are interred at the Mercer Cemetery, Trenton, New Jersey.

Medal of Honor citation

See also

List of American Civil War Medal of Honor recipients: A–F

References

1844 births
1926 deaths
English-born Medal of Honor recipients
English emigrants to the United States
People of New Jersey in the American Civil War
Union Army soldiers
United States Army Medal of Honor recipients
American Civil War recipients of the Medal of Honor